"Thriving" is a song by American singer Mary J. Blige featuring guest vocals from rapper Nas. It was written by Blige, Darhyl "DJ" Camper Jr., Nas and Denisia “Blue June” Andrews and Brittany “Chi Coney” Coney from songwriting duo Nova Wav, while production was helmed by Camper. The song is built around a sample of the song "Under the Influence of Love" (1967) by American girl group Love Unlimited. "Thriving" was released as a digital single on May 8, 2019 to commence with Nas and Blige's The Royalty Tour and peaked at number 21 on the US Adult R&B Songs.

Background
"Thriving" was written by Blige and Nas along with Darhyl "DJ" Camper Jr., and Denisia “Blue June” Andrews and Brittany “Chi Coney” Coney from songwriting duo Nova Wav. Blige performed a solo version of the song first on New York City radio station Power 105.1's The Breakfast Club and shared a snippet on Instagram in March 2019. Along with the cover art, Blige also posted a quote from poet Maya Angelou on her Instagram in April 2019, writing "my mission in life is not merely to survive, but to THRIVE, and do so with some passion, some compassion, some humor, and some style."

Track listing

Credits and personnel 
Credits adapted from the liner notes of "Thriving."

Denisia Andrews – writer
Mary J. Blige – vocals, writer
Darhyl Camper Jr. – producer, writer
Brittany Coney – writer
Lauren D'Elia – recording
Nasir Jones – vocals, writer
Tony Maserati – mixing

Charts

Release history

References

2019 singles
2019 songs
Mary J. Blige songs
Nas songs
Songs written by Darhyl Camper
Songs written by Nas
Songs written by Mary J. Blige